7005  is an aluminium wrought alloy used in bicycle frames. Due to its relative ease of welding, it does not require expensive heat treating. It is, however, harder to form, making manufacture more challenging. It has an Ultimate Tensile Strength of 350 MPa, a Fatigue Strength of 150 MPa and a density of 2.78 g/cm3. It does not need to be precipitation hardened, but can be cooled in air.

Specific forms of AL 7005 include 
 7005-O
 7005-T5
 7005-T53
 7005-T6

Chemical composition 
The alloy composition of 7005 is:

Properties

See also 

 http://www.matweb.com/search/DataSheet.aspx?MatGUID=34c308934f7a4be589a80ecbee94406e&ckck=1
 http://www.matweb.com/search/datasheet.aspx?MatGUID=418587e416114026aae056b2695c5bde
 http://www.matweb.com/search/datasheet.aspx?MatGUID=0d7139f8ea0243cfbdbc53b68a75b906

References

Aluminum alloy table 

Aluminium–zinc alloys